The lowland long-nosed squirrel (Hyosciurus ileile) is a species of rodent in the family Sciuridae. It is endemic to Sulawesi, Indonesia where its natural habitat is subtropical or tropical dry lowland grassland.

References

Thorington, R. W. Jr. and R. S. Hoffman. 2005. Family Sciuridae. pp. 754–818 in Mammal Species of the World a Taxonomic and Geographic Reference. D. E. Wilson and D. M. Reeder eds. Johns Hopkins University Press, Baltimore.

Hyosciurus
Rodents of Sulawesi
Mammals described in 1936
Taxonomy articles created by Polbot